Billy Roy Conway (born 31 January 1967) is an English amateur boxer of the 1980s, who was runner-up for the Amateur Boxing Association of England (ABAE) Junior Class-B (48 kg) title against Joe Morgan (Enfield ABC) at The City of Derby, Assembly Rooms, Derby on Saturday 21 March 1981, and former professional rugby league footballer who played in the 1980s, 1990s and 2000s.

Background
Billy Conway's birth was registered in Wakefield, West Riding of Yorkshire, England.

Playing career

County Cup Final appearances
Billy Conway played , (replaced by  interchange/substitute Richard Slater) in Wakefield Trinity's 8–11 defeat by Castleford in the 1990–91 Yorkshire County Cup Final during the 1990–91 season at Elland Road, Leeds on Sunday 23 September 1990, and played  in Wakefield Trinity's 29–16 victory over Sheffield Eagles in the 1992–93 Yorkshire County Cup Final during the 1992–93 Rugby Football League season at Elland Road, Leeds on Sunday 18 October 1992.

Testimonial match
Billy Conway's Testimonial match at Wakefield Trinity took place in 1996.

Club career
Billy Conway made his début for Wakefield Trinity against Doncaster at Belle Vue, Wakefield on Sunday 28 October 1984.

References

External links
Castleford Lock Lane, making an unprecedented ninth appearance at the third-round stage
Keighley fall to French invaders
Dragons slay Rovers
Tigers get Doncaster fright
Normanton Knights A Take Wakefield ARL Buildbase Cup
Doncaster given scare
Paul Mansson scored two tries to help Doncaster Dragons to a 36–8 victory over Hunslet Hawks
(archived by web.archive.org) Wakefield Trinity V Australia 1990
It's Alright On The Knight

1967 births
Living people
Doncaster R.L.F.C. players
English male boxers
English rugby league players
Rugby league hookers
Sportspeople from Normanton, West Yorkshire
Rugby league players from Wakefield
Wakefield Trinity players